Tippethill House Hospital is a community hospital in Armadale, West Lothian, Scotland. It is operated by NHS Lothian.

History
The facility has its origins in the Tippethill Hospital which opened as an infectious diseases hospital in 1901. It was expanded by the addition of two new blocks in 1937. A new hospital, which was procured under a Private Finance Initiative contract in 1999, was built at a cost of £2.3 million and opened in 2001.

Services
The hospital is a 60-bed hospital specialising in short term and respite care: it is split into two wards: Bailie Wing specialising in medical care and respite, and Rosebery Wing which deals with mental health care.

References

Hospitals in West Lothian
NHS Scotland hospitals